Alex Villanueva (born July 9, 2002) is an American soccer player who plays as a midfielder for USL Championship side Orange County SC and the Seattle Sounders FC academy.

References

External links
 

Association football midfielders
American soccer players
Tacoma Defiance players
Seattle Sounders FC players
Orange County SC players
USL Championship players
Soccer players from Utah
2002 births
Living people